This is a list of proposed maglev trains worldwide.  Some proposals may have been rejected.

Asia

China 
Shanghai – Hangzhou: China had planned to extend the world's first commercial Transrapid line between Pudong airport and the city of Shanghai initially by some 35 kilometers to Hong Qiao airport before the World Expo 2010 and then, in an additional phase, by 200 kilometers to the city of Hangzhou (Shanghai-Hangzhou Maglev Train), which would have been the first inter-city maglev rail line in commercial service in the world. The line would have been an extension of the Shanghai airport maglev line.

Talks with Germany and Transrapid Konsortium about the details of the construction contracts took place. While the Chinese Minister of Transportation was quoted by several Chinese and Western newspapers in 2006 as saying the line was approved, a February 27, 2009 People's Daily Online article indicates that the Shanghai municipal government is considering building the line underground to allay the public's fear of electromagnetic pollution, and that any final decision has to be approved by the National Development and Reform Commission. There are no current plans to extend the line.

India 

The Indian Ministry was in the process of reviewing a proposal to start a maglev train system in India. It had been estimated that the cost to complete the maglev line between Mumbai and Pune would be over $30 billion. The company who sent the proposals is based in the United States. If completed, the train travel time between the two cities would have been reduced to half an hour, compared to the original two hours. This is planned near Hinjawadi in an area called Pimple Saudagar. Pune and Mumbai have a freeway (also called as expressway) where approximately 14000 vehicles travel daily, making fuel consumption at .2 million liters a day . The business proposal is to reduce the fuel consumption and promote maglev by income from Carbon Credit Sales.
Mumbai – DelhiA maglev line project was presented to the then Indian railway minister (Mamata Banerjee) by an American company. A line was proposed to serve between the cities of Mumbai and Delhi, the Prime Minister Manmohan Singh said that if the line project is successful the Indian government would build lines between other cities and also between Mumbai Central and Chhatrapati Shivaji International Airport.
Mumbai – Nagpur
It plans to connect the regions of Mumbai and Pune with Nagpur via less developed hinterland (via Ahmednagar, Beed, Latur, Nanded and Yavatmal).
Chennai – Bangalore – Mysore
Per Large and Medium Scale Industries Minister of Karnataka Mr. Murugesh Nirani, a detailed report will be prepared and submitted by December 2012 and the project is expected to cost $26 million per kilometer of railway track. The speed of maglev will be 350 km/h and the Bangalore to Mysore portion would take as little as 30 minutes.
Kochi Metro
Union Minister of State for Consumer Affairs, Food and Public Distribution K. V. Thomas proposed that Kochi Metro can adopt same technology as present in South Korea.

Mumbai Maglev
A 2007 proposal, revived in 2020, for a  elevated line to connect Chhatrapati Shivaji Terminus (CSTM) and Panvel with a branch line to Navi Mumbai International Airport.

Japan 
Tokyo – Osaka: On May 27, 2011, the Transport Minister of Japan approved the Chūō Shinkansen maglev line, connecting Tokyo to Osaka and expanding off of the existing test track in Yamanashi prefecture. Construction began in 2014 with the first segment from Tokyo to Nagoya to be completed by 2027.  The second segment from Nagoya to Osaka is expected to be completed by 2045.  The 550 km-line will have a top operating speed of 500 km/h and a travel time between Tokyo and Osaka of just 67 minutes.

Malaysia 
Johor: Malaysia has decided to use maglev technology to link important landmarks across the city. This will be a boost to business to compete against the neighbouring city, Singapore. The system will be a monorail type maglev, developed in China.

Philippines 
Cebu: Philtram Consortium's Cebu Monorail project will be initially built as a monorail system. In the future, it will be upgraded to a patented monorail-type maglev technology named the Spin-Induced Lenz's Law Magnetic Levitation Train.

Hong Kong 
Kowloon – Border with China: The Express Rail Link, previously known as the Regional Express, which will connect Kowloon with the territory's border with China, explored different technologies and designs in its planning stage, between maglev and conventional highspeed railway, and if the latter was chosen, between a dedicated new route and sharing the tracks with the existing West Rail. Instead of a maglev, a conventional highspeed train with a dedicated new route was built and became operational on 23 September 2018.

Europe

Denmark 
A Maglev connection between Copenhagen and Århus was proposed.

Germany 
Munich: A Transrapid connection linking the city centre of the Bavarian capital Munich to the airport (37 km) was planned. It promised to reduce the connection time from about 40 minutes by the existing S-Bahn (German city railway system) to 10 minutes. On September 25, 2007, Bavaria announced it would build Europe's first commercial track. The Bavarian government signed a contract with Deutsche Bahn and Transrapid  with Siemens and ThyssenKrupp for the 1.85 billion-euro ($2.6 billion) project. However, the project was strongly opposed by Christian Ude, the mayor of Munich. On 27 March 2008, the German government scrapped the project because of a massive cost overrun.

Berlin – Hamburg: A 292 km Transrapid line linking Berlin to Hamburg. It was cancelled due to lack of funds, and the existing conventional railway line was upgraded for 230 km/h operation by ICE trainsets instead.

Switzerland 
SwissRapide: The SwissRapide AG in co-operation with the SwissRapide Consortium are developing and promoting an above-ground maglev monorail system, based on the Transrapid technology. The first projects planned are the lines Berne – Zurich, Lausanne – Geneva as well as Zurich – Winterthur.

Swissmetro: Swissmetro has previously had the vision of constructing an underground maglev rail system. As with SwissRapide, Swissmetro envisioned connecting the major cities in Switzerland with one another. In 2011, Swissmetro AG was dissolved and the intellectual property rights from the organisation were passed onto the EPFL in Lausanne.

Spain
A two-line, 120-kilometers (75-mile)-long system has been proposed for the island of Tenerife.  It would connect the island capital Santa Cruz in the north with Costa Adeje in the south and Los Realejos in the northwest with a maximum speed of 270 km/h (169 mph) at an estimated cost of €3 billion.

United Kingdom 

London – Glasgow: A  maglev line was proposed in the United Kingdom from London to Glasgow via Birmingham, Manchester, Leeds, Newcastle and Edinburgh with spurs to Heathrow Airport and Liverpool.  It was rejected by the Government in 2007 and the company behind it ceased promotion of the scheme in early 2013.

Glasgow – Edinburgh: A separate maglev link is also being planned between Glasgow Airport and Glasgow to Edinburgh Airport and Edinburgh which would cut journey time between the two cities from one hour to 15 minutes.  Work was set to begin as early as January 2008. However, there has been no settlement on the technology for this concept yet, i.e. maglev/hi speed electric, etc.

Liverpool – Hull: A proposed underground  maglev network, proposed by Transport for the North, would link up Liverpool, Manchester, Leeds and Hull  in the North of England.

North America

Puerto Rico
San Juan – Caguas: A  maglev project has been proposed linking Tren Urbano's Cupey Station in San Juan with two proposed stations to be built in the city of Caguas, south of San Juan. The maglev line would run along Highway PR-52 connecting both cities. According to American Maglev Technology (AMT), who is the company in charge of the construction of this train, the cost of this project is approximately US$380 million.

United States
As of 2022, the United States has no maglev trains.

Keystone Corridor: According to Transrapid, Inc., Pittsburgh has the most advanced maglev initiative in the U.S., followed by the Las Vegas project. Once federal funding is finalized, these two markets could be the first to see maglev in the United States. Initially, the project calls for a transrapid system throughout the metro Pittsburgh area. Further planning calls for extensions eastward to Harrisburg and Philadelphia. Upon completion, a commute from Pittsburgh to Philadelphia would be reduced to 90–120 minutes. A commuter traversing the Pennsylvania Turnpike would currently spend approximately 5hrs if traveling at the speed limit.

California-Nevada Interstate Maglev
High-speed maglev lines between major cities of southern California and Las Vegas are also being studied via the California-Nevada Interstate Maglev Project. This plan was originally supposed to be part of an I-5 or I-15 expansion plan, but the federal government has ruled it must be separated from interstate public work projects.

Since the federal government decision, private groups from Nevada have proposed a line running from Las Vegas to Los Angeles with stops in Primm, Nevada; Baker, California; and points throughout Riverside County into Los Angeles.

Washington, D.C. - New York City: Using  Superconducting Maglev (SCMAGLEV) technology developed by the Central Japan Railway Company, the Northeast Maglev would ultimately connect major Northeast metropolitan hubs and airports with a goal of one-hour service from Washington, D.C. to New York City. The Federal Railroad Administration and Maryland Department of Transportation are currently preparing an Environmental Impact Statement (EIS) to evaluate the potential impacts of constructing and operating the system's first leg between Washington, DC and Baltimore, Maryland with an intermediate stop at BWI Airport.

San Diego: San Diego is considering a high-speed maglev line to serve as a passenger transportation mode to remote airport sites under consideration. The cost estimate is approximately US$10 billion for the 120–150 km (80–100 mile) run, not including the cost of construction of the airport.

Atlanta – Chattanooga: The proposed maglev route would run from Hartsfield-Jackson Atlanta International Airport, run through Atlanta, continue  to the northern suburbs of Atlanta, and possibly even extend to Chattanooga, Tennessee. Official proposals also exist to extend the route to Nashville. If built, the maglev line would rival Atlanta's current subway system, the Metropolitan Atlanta Rapid Transit Authority (MARTA), the rail system of which includes a major branch running from downtown Atlanta to Hartsfield-Jackson airport.

Orlando maglev: In December 2012, the Florida Department of Transportation gave conditional approval to a proposal by American Maglev to build a privately run 14.9 mile, 5 station line from the Orlando International Airport to the Orange County Convention Center.  The department requested a technical assessment of the technology and said there would be a "request for proposals" issued to see if there are any competing plans. The route requires the use of a public right of way. If the first phase is successful American Maglev would propose extensions in two further phases (4.9 miles and 19.4 miles) to carry the line to Walt Disney World.

Old Dominion University, Norfolk, VA: 
In 1999, Old Dominion University agreed to work with American Maglev of Atlanta to construct an on-campus student transportation link of less than one mile — using a smart train / dumb track design in which most sensors, magnets, and computation were located on the train rather than the track. Several other institutes of higher learning rejected the project with cost and safety concerns. While projected to cost less to build per mile than existing systems, the ODU maglev was never operational. After far exceeding its projected $14 million budget, a groundbreaking was held in 2001, the project was completed in 2002; and the technology failed: the vehicle lost its "float" and come to a full friction stop on top of the rail, damaging much of the system. American Maglev and ODU dissolved their relationship and the project became an internal university research project.  In October 2006, the research team performed an unscheduled test of the car that went smoothly. The system was subsequently removed from the power grid for nearby construction. In February 2009, the team retested the sled and was successful despite power outages on campus. ODU subsequently partnered with a Massachusetts-based company to test another maglev train. MagneMotion Inc. was expected to bring its prototype maglev vehicle, about the size of a van, to the campus to test in 2010.

References

External links 
 The International Maglevboard

Proposed public transport